An dro or en dro (Breton: "The Turn") is a Breton folk dance in . It is a form of a circle dance.

Technique
The dancers link little fingers in a long line, swinging their arms, and moving to their left by taking longer steps in that direction than when stepping right.  In the generic case the arm movements consist first of two circular motions going up and back (at about chest level) followed by one in the opposite direction (down then front); these are done quite close to the body. This is then followed by a circle in the same sense as the last (down then front) but with full arm extension and extending behind the body. The cycle then repeats.

Steps
Stepping is on the beat throughout, moving to the left on the close arm circles and in place (or sometimes to the right) on the second two. The stance is upright, with soft knees. A full set of steps takes 8 times, divided in two half-steps:

1st half-step, 4 counts:
 1st count: the left foot moves on the left
 2nd count: the right foot joins the left foot
 3rd count: the left foot moves again
 4th count: the feet don't move, the body still supported by the left foot
2nd half-step, 4 counts:
 5th count: the right foot joins the left foot
 6th count: the left foot marks time (up & down in one time)
 7th count: the right foot marks time (up & down in one time)
 8th count: the feet don't move, the body stands on the right foot.
It is easy to do this dance within a short time of practice; this allows full beginners to quickly join the line during the festoù noz.

Customs
At a bal there will be several lines forming, with the leader leading his/her line in some pattern. The leader (person at the left-hand end of the line) will lead the line into a spiral or double it back on itself to form patterns on the dance floor, and allow the dancers to see each other.

An dros often have songs associated with them, and these are usually sung as a verse-chorus or call-response, with the leader singing the verses or calls. The musicians will sometimes play from the middle of the dance floor, and the dancers will then often form a spiral around them.

See also
Dabke
Faroese dance
Fest Noz
Hora
Khigga
Kolo
List of ethnic, regional, and folk dances by origin
Syrtos
Tamzara, another circle dance where the participants interlock their pinkies
Yalli

External links
 A YouTube video of the dance—which begins at 1:18

Breton dances
Circle dances